The 2016 Intrust Super Premiership NSW is the ninth season of the NSW Cup, and the first since its sponsorship by Intrust Super. The winner will compete in the 2016 NRL State Championship, against the winner of the 2016 Queensland Cup.

Teams

*: The season the team joined is in the NSW Cup/Intrust Super Premiership, not any other competition before this.

Ladder

Finals

The finals commenced on 3 September.

Ron Massey Cup

Ladder

Finals

Sydney Shield

Ladder

Finals

References

2016 in Australian rugby league
New South Wales Cup
2016 in New Zealand rugby league